Orlando Paladino Orlandini (2 January 1905 – 6 March 1986) was an Italian sculptor. His work was part of the sculpture event in the art competition at the 1936 Summer Olympics.

References

1905 births
1986 deaths
20th-century Italian sculptors
20th-century Italian male artists
Italian male sculptors
Olympic competitors in art competitions
Sculptors from Tuscany
People from Scansano